American singer-songwriter Sara Bareilles has released seven studio albums, two demo albums, four live albums, two soundtrack albums, six extended plays, twenty-one singles and thirteen music videos. After graduating from University of California, Los Angeles, Bareilles independently released her debut album Careful Confessions in January 2004. In 2005, music executive Charlie Walk signed her to a record deal with Epic Records. A year after, she began to work with Eric Rosse on her second studio album, Little Voice, which featured six re-recorded songs of the twelve that were originally on Careful Confessions, plus six additional songs. Little Voice was released in July 2007 and entered the Billboard 200 chart in the United States at number 45, which marked as her chart debut. The album became a commercial success, it peaked on the chart at number 7 and was certified platinum by the Recording Industry Association of America (RIAA) for shipments of one million copies in the United States, subsequently becoming her most successful studio album to date. Its lead single, "Love Song", became a worldwide hit, charting at the top-ten in many regions. Epic released two additional singles, "Bottle It Up" and "Gravity", from Little Voice.

After experiencing a writer's block, she began to work for her third studio album with Neal Avron in 2009. The album, Kaleidoscope Heart, was released in September 2010 and debuted at the top of the Billboard 200 chart. Its lead single, "King of Anything", became a top-forty hit on the Billboard Hot 100, and was succeeded by "Uncharted" and  "Gonna Get Over You" as the album's subsequent single releases. In 2013, Bareilles began to work for her fourth studio album, The Blessed Unrest, after moving to New York City. The album was released in July 2013 and entered the Billboard 200 chart at number 2. Two singles, "Brave" and "I Choose You", were released from The Blessed Unrest, with "Brave" surpassing "Love Song" as her longest-staying song on the Billboard Hot 100. According to Epic Records, Bareilles has sold over 2.05 million albums and 9 million singles in the United States.

Albums

Studio albums

Soundtrack and cast albums

Demo albums

Live albums

Extended plays

Singles

Featured singles

Other appearances

Music videos

References

Notes

External links
 

Discographies of American artists
Pop music discographies
Discography